Carol Elizabeth Anway (also published as Carol Anway-Wiese; born 1965) is a retired American physicist known for her work on computatational industrial physics for Boeing, and particularly on lightning protection for airplanes.

Education and career
Anway grew up in Superior, Wisconsin, and studied physics and mathematics at Hamline University in Minnesota. She completed a Ph.D. in physics at the University of California, Los Angeles in 1995. Her dissertation, Search for Rare Decays of the B Meson at 1.8-TeV  Collisions at CDF, concerned particle physics experiments on the Collider Detector at Fermilab, where she was part of a team that discovered the top quark. Her research was supervised by Thomas Müller, who later became a professor at the Karlsruhe Institute of Technology.

After completing her Ph.D. she worked for Boeing, on military aircraft and on lightning protection for commercial aircraft. She retired from Boeing in 2020.

Recognition
Anway was named as a Fellow of the American Physical Society (APS) in 2018, after a nomination from the APS Forum on Industrial & Applied Physics, "for revolutionary advances in the areas of computational industrial physics, specifically in advanced simulation tools enabling modeling and predictive behavior of sensor and communication architectures in highly complex systems".

References

1965 births
Living people
People from Superior, Wisconsin
American physicists
American women physicists
Hamline University alumni
University of California, Los Angeles alumni
Boeing people
Fellows of the American Physical Society